John Hogg (1800–1869) was a British naturalist who wrote about amphibians, birds, plants, reptiles, and protists. In 1839, he became a member of the Royal Society.

John Hogg is credited with the creation of a fourth kingdom, accompanying Carl Linnaeus's Lapides, Plantae and Animalia, to classify Life, namely Protoctista.

Background
In 1735, the Swedish botanist Carl Linnaeus formalized living things into two supergroups, in his monumental Systema Naturae. All organisms were placed into the Kingdoms Plantae and Animalia. Linnaeus added a third kingdom of the natural world in 1766; Lapides (rocks). These were deemed to be similar to plants in that they were, neither living nor sentient, i.e. not having senses. They were further characterised as solid bodied.

Fourth kingdom

In 1860, Hogg created a fourth kingdom, the Regnum Primigenum or Protoctista. His rationale was simply that a kingdom of 'first beings' was necessary, as these entities were believed to have existed prior to plants and animals.

Hogg attempted to justify his arguments for a fourth kingdom with Spongilla, a freshwater green sponge, that was an animal known to exude oxygen in the light. However, the photosynthesis was later shown to be a result of symbiotic 'algae'.

Such an attempt to apply non-reductionist thought to classification systems during a period of biological debate made Hogg a protagonist within the field of nineteenth century biology along with Ernst Haeckel and Charles Darwin.

References

1800 births
1869 deaths
Fellows of the Royal Society